Hoàng Thùy Linh (born August 11, 1988) is a Vietnamese V-pop singer and actress.

Early years
As a former student of Hanoi's College of Art, she was trained to be an actress. Thùy Linh had also joined girlband Thien Than (Angels).
During her teenage years, Thùy Linh was a presenter for HanoiTV's game show for children Vui Cùng Hugo. She was famous as a teenager, winning Hoa Học Trò's ICON contest in 2006, and by participating in many TV commercials and adverts as well as being on magazine covers for teenagers.

Thùy Linh's first appearance as an actress was the role in Đường đời (Path of life) drama as a little girl named Thùy (2004, 25 episodes, Golden Award – Vietnam Drama Festival 2005). After that success, she was cast in two other dramas Trò đùa của số phận (Laugh of destiny) (2005, 18 episodes) filmed by Director Huy Thuần, and her Lan role in Đi về phía mặt trời (Journey to the Sun)(2006, 29 episodes) of Director Lưu Trọng Ninh.

In 2006, Thùy Linh started studying at the Department of TV director – Vietnam Acting and Film College and graduated in 2009.

In 2007 Thùy Linh was cast for a leading role in the second season of an interactive television program – "Vàng Anh's Diary" originally known as Nhật ký Vàng Anh – a well received sitcom remaked from "Sofia's Diary" from Portugal due to its educational inspirations to Vietnamese youth.

Controversy
In September 2007, a video of Thùy Linh having sexual intercourse with her boyfriend (known as Viet "dart") was leaked online. The video first hit YouTube and was quickly removed, but then it found its way onto the Vietnamese forums. The video spread widely throughout the nation and was the biggest scandal ever in the Vietnamese entertainment industry. The scandal caused an outcry domestically and internationally with the outstanding involvement of the media from the UK and the US. The incident was also mentioned by Perez Hilton on her blog. The affair generated public debates in many ways, the teenage youth called for a sympathetic tolerance to Thùy Linh while adults, as parents in particular, heavily criticized and even informally demanded from her an official apology for indirectly putting the end to an education oriented TV program of Vietnam's youth.

On September 14, 2007, producers of Vàng Anh's Diary announced the cancellation of the show with the last episode was a pre-recorded talk show with Thùy Linh where she publicly apologized for the video. VTV later was heavily criticized for this show.

Post Scandal career
After the scandal, Thùy Linh went low-profile for a year and then returned to the scene in 2010 with the self-titled debut album "Hoàng Thùy Linh – Vol.1". Though it received very little promotion, the album still managed to gain much success with many critics who praised her singing ability and the album's quality.

In May 2011, Thùy Linh released her second album entitled "Đừng Vội Vàng" (No Hurry).  Similar to her debut album, many critics praised her singing ability and the album's production.

Both albums have the Pop, Dance-Pop style.

On March 6, 2018, she published her autobiography "Vàng Anh & Phượng Hoàng" (Vang Anh and Phoenix), which chronicles her career, including her thought on the scandal.

Filmography

Film

Television

Discography

Albums

Studio albums

Compilations

Extended plays

Singles

As lead artist

Promotional singles

Other charted songs

Awards and nominations

Music 

Devotion Music Awards
The award is considered as an "Grammy Award" in Vietnamese music. Hoang Thuy Linh is the first Vietnamese artist to ever win the "big four" categories in the same year.

Harper's Bazaar Star Awards

Golden Apricot Blossom Awards

Green Wave Music Awards
Green Wave  Music Awards is one of the oldest and most prestigious annual music awards in the Vietnamese music industry. It was started in 1997 with the governing body being the 99.9 MHz FM radio station of the Voice of the People of Ho Chi Minh City. Hoang Thuy Linh is the first artist in history to win all 8 nominated categories in the same year.

Men&Life Awards

METUB WebTVAsia Awards

Mnet Asian Music Awards

POP Music Awards

YanVpop20 Awards

Zing Music Awards

Acting 

Golden Kite Awards
The Vietnam Cinema Association Awards, popularly known as the Kite Awards or Golden Kite Awards (Vietnamese: Giải thưởng Hội Điện ảnh Việt Nam, Giải Cánh diều or Cánh diều vàng) since 2003, is an annual awards ceremony, recognizing the excellence of Vietnamese films, television series and videos produced during a year in Vietnam. The ceremony is usually held early next year. Often considered the Oscars of Vietnam, this is the most popular film and television award in Vietnam.

VTV Festival

Other accolades 

ELLE Style Awards

WeChoice Awards

Notes

References

External links
Blog của Hoàng Thùy Linh (Yahoo)
Hoàng Thùy Linh: Đã gượng dậy sau scandal
BBC, Web sex clip halts Vietnam TV show

1988 births
Living people
MAMA Award winners
People from Hanoi
21st-century Vietnamese actresses
Vietnamese female models
21st-century Vietnamese women singers
Vietnamese television actresses
2007 scandals
Sex scandals